Michael Burley (born January 27, 1953) is an American modern pentathlete. He competed at the 1976 Summer Olympics and qualified for the 1980 U.S. Olympic team but was unable to compete due to the U.S. Olympic Committee's boycott of the 1980 Summer Olympics in Moscow, Russia. He was one of 461 athletes to receive a Congressional Gold Medal many years later.

References

1953 births
Living people
American male modern pentathletes
Olympic modern pentathletes of the United States
Modern pentathletes at the 1976 Summer Olympics
Sportspeople from Columbus, Ohio
Congressional Gold Medal recipients
20th-century American people
21st-century American people